The 2021 NXT: New Year's Evil was the first annual NXT: New Year's Evil professional wrestling event produced by WWE. The event aired as a special episode of WWE's weekly television series NXT, broadcast on the USA Network. It took place on January 6, 2021, at the WWE Performance Center in Orlando, Florida and featured WWE's virtual fan viewing experience for their NXT brand division called the Capitol Wrestling Center. This event was the first to have its New Year's themed since New Year's Revolution in 2007. It was hosted by Dexter Lumis.

Six matches were contested at the event. In the main event, Finn Balor defeated Kyle O'Reilly to retain the NXT Championship. In other prominent matches, Santos Escobar defeated Gran Metalik to retain the NXT Cruiserweight Championship, Raquel González defeated Rhea Ripley in a Last Woman Standing match, and in the opening bout, Karrion Kross defeated Damian Priest.

Production

Background 
New Year's Evil is a professional wrestling event currently produced by WWE. It was last used for a special episode of WCW Monday Nitro on December 27, 1999; WWE acquired World Championship Wrestling (WCW) in 2001. After 21 years since that WCW event, WWE revived the name for their January 6, 2021 episode of NXT. Prior to this event, WWE also organized a pay-per-view in a similar theme, New Year's Revolution, which was held from 2005 to 2007. WWE also announced that the show would be hosted by NXT wrestler Dexter Lumis.

Impact of the COVID-19 pandemic
Due to the COVID-19 pandemic, WWE's NXT events had to be presented from a behind closed doors set at NXT's home base of Full Sail University in Winter Park, Florida since mid-March; WWE's programming for Raw and SmackDown were also done in this manner but at the WWE Performance Center in Orlando, Florida, before moving to Orlando's Amway Center in August in a setup dubbed the WWE ThunderDome (the ThunderDome was then relocated to Tropicana Field in St. Petersburg, Florida in December). In October 2020, it was announced that beginning with TakeOver 31, NXT would be moving their events to the Performance Center, which would feature the new "Capitol Wrestling Center" setup, an homage to the Capitol Wrestling Corporation, the predecessor to WWE. Like the ThunderDome for Raw and SmackDown, LED boards were placed around the Performance Center so that fans could attend virtually, while additionally, friends and family members of the wrestlers were in attendance, along with a limited number of actual live fans, divided from each other by plexiglass walls.

Storylines 
NXT: New Year's Evil featured professional wrestling matches that involved different wrestlers from pre-existing scripted feuds and storylines. Wrestlers portrayed heroes, villains, or less distinguishable characters in scripted events that built tension and culminated in a wrestling match or series of matches.

Results

Notes

References

External links 
 

2021 in professional wrestling in Florida
2021 in professional wrestling
Events in Orlando, Florida
January 2021 events in the United States
Impact of the COVID-19 pandemic on television
Professional wrestling in Orlando, Florida
Holidays themed professional wrestling events
WWE NXT